PSJ may refer to:

Port St. John, Florida, USA; a CDP
Kasiguncu Airport (IATA airport code: PSJ, ICAO airport code: WAMP), Poso, Indonesia
Photographic Society of Japan
Philippine School in Jeddah, now International Philippine School in Jeddah